Brian Greene (born February 15, 1972) is a former American football  player who played six seasons in the Arena Football League with the Charlotte Rage, Portland Forest Dragons/Oklahoma Wranglers and Los Angeles Avengers. He played college football at Western Oregon State College.

References

External links
Just Sports Stats

Living people
1972 births
Players of American football from Oregon
American football wide receivers
American football defensive backs
Western Oregon Wolves football players
Charlotte Rage players
Portland Forest Dragons players
Oklahoma Wranglers players
Los Angeles Avengers players
People from Redmond, Oregon